Mark Heckles is a British professional motorcycle racer.

Heckles is the son of Keith Heckles, the 1976 Manx Grand Prix lap record holder.

In 1994, Mark Heckles started competing professionally on an international level. In 1994, he operated as a self-funded privateer. In 2015 , Heckles joined Ryders Alley Racing in the MotoAmerica road racing series.

Career 
 2014 5 Expert Championships, CCS Atlantic Championship, Atlantic Region: Overall
 Points 3rd Place, Mid Atlantic Region: Overall Points 3rd Place
 2013 CCS Atlantic Championship. Multiple wins and podiums in all classes.
 2006 Aintree Clubmans Championship. Multiple wins
 2004 British Superstock Championship.
 2003 British Superbike Championship.
 2002 World Superbike Championship.
 2001 European Superstock Championship. Finished 3rd in Championship.
 2000 British 250 Aprilia Challenge.
 1999 British Supersport Championship.
 1997-1998 Club Championships TZR125 & RS125
 1996 British Superteen challenge.
 1994-95 Two-time British Mini Moto Champion with Polini.

References

Living people
British motorcycle racers
1976 births